Rabbi Eliyahu Leon Levi (Hebrew: אליהו ליאון לוי), also called Baba Leon, (1939 – July 20, 2015) was a well-known Rabbi and Kabbalist, author of the prayer "Tikun-Yesod Yeshuat-Eliyahu".

Biography 

Levi was born as the youngest child of Shafika & Rabbi Yeshua, who was chief rabbi of Marash, now Kahramanmaraş, Turkey. When he was 8 years old, his family emigrated to Israel and settled in Ness Ziona, later moving to the Ezra neighborhood of Tel Aviv, where his father established "Ezra and Tushia" Beth Midrash and was the Rabbi of Turkey immigrants.

At the age of 12 he studied in "Ohel Moed" Yeshiva in Tel-Aviv, and at the age of 18 he studied at a Chabad Yeshiva in the city. When he was 21 he joined the Israel Defense Forces and served in the Paratroopers Brigade, but as a child to a bereaved family who lost her son Yehuda in the 1948 Arab–Israeli War, he was released a year later. He married Shoshana and studied for four years at the Beit Hillel Kolel, and afterwards started his Kabbalah studies.

Later he moved to Bnei Brak and established the "Tikuney-Eliyahu and Maayaney-Hayeshua" Yeshiva for Kabbalah studies.

Rabbi Leon was also well known as a singer and was proficient in Maqam singing.

Tikun Yesod 

Rabbi Leon authored the "Tikun-Yesod Yeshuat-Eliyahu", a special prayer for Pgam Habrit, and for decades he traveled between synagogues in Israel and abroad to bequeath this prayer. This prayer took place every Tuesday of the Shovavim days, in a night of praying, singing and crying until sunrise. The last prayer each year took place at the Western Wall and attracted thousands of followers.

The Western Wall 

For about 45 years, Rabbi Leon visited the Western Wall twice each week: once at the middle of the week and the second time on Saturday night with his followers, where they read the Plams book several times and Rabbi Leon gave his weekly homily. They also visited the Western Wall each Rosh Chodesh for a special Rosh Chodesh prayer.

Books 

 Yeshuot Eliayhu (Hebrew: ישועות אליהו)
 Kdushat Israel (Hebrew: קדושת ישראל)
 Tsaakat Israel (Hebrew: צעקת ישראל) 
 Mishbezot Zahav Levusha (Hebrew: משבצות זהב לבושה)

Sons 
 His firstborn Rav Yehusua, head of "Ateret Haleviim" Yeshiva
 Rav Haim, a Rabbi at the "Ateret Haleviim" Yeshiva 
 Cantor Shmual, chief cantor of the Safra synagogue in Manhattan
 Avraham, Isaac and Yosef

References

External links

 The night of the Tikun, by Zvi Fishman (Hebrew)
 The funeral procession, Kikar-Hashabbat (Hebrew)
 Images from the Shiv'ah, Kikar-Hashabbat (Hebrew)
 Images of Rabbi Leon's life Kikar-Hashabbat (Hebrew)

1939 births
2015 deaths
Israeli rabbis
Kabbalists
Sephardic Haredi rabbis in Israel
People from Kahramanmaraş
Turkish emigrants to Israel